Wooster Mountain State Park is an undeveloped public recreation area located within the city limits of Danbury, Connecticut.

History
The park was established in 1920 as Connecticut's 23rd state park through an initial purchase of 100 acres. The State Park Commission adopted the name Wooster Mountain, which was not used locally, "for its historical association, as marking the mountain mass over which General [David] Wooster pursued British troops in their hasty retreat from Danbury" in 1777, during which General Wooster was mortally wounded.

The Civilian Conservation Corps was active in the park from 1935 to 1937, clearing trees that were infected with Dutch elm disease. The CCC's former campground forms the site of the Wooster Mountain firing range.

Activities and amenities
The park is suitable for hiking and hunting and is crossed by the Ives Trail. Target, skeet and trap shooting are offered at the Wooster Mountain State Park Cooperative Shooting Range.

References

External links
Wooster Mountain State Park Connecticut Department of Energy and Environmental Protection

State parks of Connecticut
Parks in Fairfield County, Connecticut
Geography of Danbury, Connecticut
Protected areas established in 1920
1920 establishments in Connecticut
Civilian Conservation Corps in Connecticut